Chambley-Bussières Air Base is a former United States Air Force base in France.

The first use of Chambley-Bussières as an airfield was in 1940, when the French Air Force stationed 9 Potez 631 fighters and 5 Mureaux 117 observation aircraft on farmland. The aircraft were assigned to the GAO 2/506. After the Battle of France ended in May, 1940, Chambley-Bussieres was abandoned as an air base and returned to agricultural use. During the Cold War, Chambley-Bussières was a front-line base for the United States Air Forces in Europe (USAFE).

United States Air Force use
In 1951 as a result of the Cold War threat of the Soviet Union, Chambley-Bussières was provided for use by the United States Air Force. Construction of the base on former farmland started in 1952, although construction delays prevented the facility from being ready for wing operations until mid-1955.

On 30 January 1953 during the initial construction period, the 73rd Air Depot Wing at Chateauroux Air Depot sent a small team to establish Flight A, 73rd Support Group Depot, Chambley. This flight was sent to receive, store and issue USAF supplies as needed by Air Force personnel and French contractors. This team lived near the main train station in Metz on the local economy and ensured at least one USAF airman was always present on the new base to provide site security.

The design of the airfield was to space parked aircraft as far apart as possible by the construction of a circular marguerite system of hardstands that could be revetted later with earth for added protection. Typically the marguerite consisted of fifteen to eighteen hardstands around a large central hangar. Each hardstand held one or two aircraft, and allowed the planes to be spaced approximately 150 feet (50 m) apart. Each squadron was assigned to a separate hangar/hardstand complex. This construction can be seen clearly in the satellite image link at the bottom of this article.

Enough construction was completed by February 1954 that USAFE established the 7002d Air Base Squadron at Chambley to coordinate the set-up of various facilities, such as security, supply, transportation and communications.

Chambley Air Base was formally dedicated and turned over to the USAF on 12 June 1956.

21st Fighter-Bomber Wing

The first USAF unit to use Chambley AB was the 21st Fighter-Bomber Wing, being transferred from George AFB, California. The wing's deployment to France had to be carried out in stages. Four echelons of wing personnel variously traveled by train, ship, and air to reach Chambley between November 1954 and January 1955. The 21 FBW officially established its headquarters at Chambley on 12 December 1954. The 21 FBW consisted of three squadrons, the 72d, 416th and 531st Fighter-Bomber Squadrons, equipped with the F-86F "Sabre". 
In 1957, the Cabinet of France decreed that all nuclear weapons and delivery aircraft had to be removed from French soil by July 1958. As a result, the F-86's of the 21st Fighter-Bomber Wing had to be removed from France. During October 1957 it was announced that the 21 FBW would be inactivated on 8 February 1958, and that its assets would be dispersed among existing USAFE units.

After three years without any permanent flying units, in 1961 Chambley Air Base was reactivated as part of Operation Tack Hammer, the United States response to the Berlin Crisis of 1961. On 1 October 1961, as a result of the crisis, the mobilized Indiana Air National Guard 122d Tactical Fighter Wing was deployed to Chambley from Baer Field, Fort Wayne, Indiana. When activated, the 122d consisted of three tactical fighter squadrons, the 112th at Toledo Express Airport, Ohio; the 113th at Hulman Field, Terre Haute, and the 163d at Baer Field. The deployed wing was designated the 7122d Tactical Wing while in France. By 1 December the ground support units arrived and the 7122d prepared for an estimated overseas deployment of 10 months.

On 7 June the 163d was directed to return to CONUS with all personnel, however the aircraft and equipment were to remain at Chambley.

The assets of the ANG 163rd TFS at Chambley were assigned to the 390th Tactical Fighter Squadron.

With the departure of the 390th TFS/366 TFW, Chambley-Bussieres AB was again placed in reserve status, being used for various USAFE exercises over the next two years. The facility was turned over to the 7367th Combat Support Group which acted as the host USAF unit.

25th Tactical Reconnaissance Wing
The 25th Tactical Reconnaissance Wing was activated on 1 July 1965 at Chambley AB, and absorbed the 19th Tactical Reconnaissance Squadron and 42d Electronic Countermeasures Squadron. On 1 May 1966, the 42d was inactivated and the squadrons remaining aircraft were deployed to Takhli RTAFB, with all of its assets in Thailand being assigned to the 41st Tactical Electronic Warfare Squadron (TEWS). The remaining aircraft of the 25 TRW were assigned to the 363d Tactical Reconnaissance Wing, Shaw AFB, South Carolina. On 15 October 1966 the 25 TRW was inactivated. The 7367th Combat Support Group was activated to close the facility.

On 1 April 1967, the last USAF personnel left Chambley AB, and the base was returned to French control.

Current uses

After the USAF's departure in 1967, the French Air Force (Armée de l'Air) assumed control of Chambley AB. It was used for various flight operations and also by airborne forces for many years.

Today, Chambley is being developed into a commercial business park. The runway and various taxiways are intact and usable. Many of the old USAF buildings and hangars are used for various non-military purposes.

The airfield is still classified as being a military airfield, however many aeronautical activities take place in particular by the means of a club of Ultralight aircraft since more than 20 years and the "Lorraine Mondial Air Ballons", which is Europe's largest hot air balloon festival and takes place here every two years at the end of July.

Since July 16, 2009, the main runway (05-23) of the airfield is now open to civil air traffic restricted to Very Light Aircraft with code LFJY.

References

General

 McAuliffe, Jerome J. (2005). US Air Force in France 1950–1967. San Diego, California: Milspec Press, Chapter 7, Chambley-Bussieres Air Base. .
 Ravenstein, Charles A. (1984). Air Force Combat Wings Lineage and Honors Histories 1947–1977. Maxwell AFB, Alabama: Office of Air Force History. .
 Endicott, Judy G. (1999) Active Air Force wings as of 1 October 1995; USAF active flying, space, and missile squadrons as of 1 October 1995. Maxwell AFB, Alabama: Office of Air Force History. CD-ROM.
 USAAS-USAAC-USAAF-USAF Aircraft Serial Numbers − 1908 to present
 Loubette, Fabrice (2008). Les Forces aériennes de l'OTAN en Lorraine, 1952–1967. Metz, France : Serpenoise, Part II, Chapter 4, Chambley Air Base. .

Specific

External links

 19th Tactical Reconnaissance Squadron
 Republic F-84F 52-6475 of the 163rd TFS/366th TFW on display at the Pacific Coast Air Museum
 Aviation Photos: Chambley-Bussières Air Base
 Club of Ultralight Aircraft of Chambley-Bussières Air Base
 Pilatre de Rozier website – Europe's largest balloon event held at Chambley-Bussieres every two years

Military installations of the United States in France
French Air and Space Force bases
Buildings and structures in Meurthe-et-Moselle